Edwin Earle Myers (December 18, 1896 – August 31, 1978) was an American athlete who competed in the men's pole vault.  He competed at the 1920 Summer Olympics and won bronze, behind Danish pole vaulter Henry Petersen who won silver. He attended Dartmouth College. He was born in Hinsdale, Illinois and died in Evanston, Illinois.

References

External links
 
 databaseOlympics profile

1896 births
1978 deaths
American male pole vaulters
Athletes (track and field) at the 1920 Summer Olympics
Olympic bronze medalists for the United States in track and field
Dartmouth College alumni
People from Hinsdale, Illinois
Medalists at the 1920 Summer Olympics